The Swedish Chess Federation (SSF) is the national organization for chess in Sweden. It was founded in 1917 and is headquartered in Stockholm. The organization has a 9-member board of directors led by a chairman; Carl Fredrik Johansson has been chairman since 2013.

The Swedish Chess Federation also organizes a Swedish Chess Championship.

Chairmen 
1917–1939 Ludvig Collijn, Stockholm
1940–1947 Erik Olson, Göteborg
1947–1964 Folke Rogard, Stockholm
1964–1965 Nils Grenander, Göteborg
1965–1969 Nils Kellgren, Stockholm
1969–1977 Birger Öhman, Stockholm
1977–1999 Christer Wänéus, Norrköping
2000–2007 Ingvar Carlsson, Linköping
2007–2010 Ari Ziegler, Göteborg
2010–2013 Anil Surender, Malmö
2013– Carl Fredrik Johansson, Uppsala

External links
  

National members of the European Chess Union
Chess in Sweden
Chess
1917 establishments in Sweden
Sports organizations established in 1917
Chess organizations
1917 in chess